Alex Gibson (25 January 1925 – 21 April 1993) was a Scottish footballer, who played as a right back for Arthurlie, Clyde, Hull City, Stirling Albion and Morton. Gibson played in the 1949 Scottish Cup Final for Clyde.

References

Sources

1925 births
1993 deaths
Footballers from Glasgow
Scottish footballers
Association football fullbacks
Arthurlie F.C. players
Clyde F.C. players
Hull City A.F.C. players
Stirling Albion F.C. players
Greenock Morton F.C. players
Scottish Football League players
English Football League players